Marta Magdalena Abakanowicz-Kosmowska (20 June 1930 – 20 April 2017) was a Polish sculptor and fiber artist. She was known for her use of textiles as a sculptural medium and her outdoor installations. She is widely regarded as one of Poland's most internationally acclaimed artists. She was a professor at the Academy of Fine Arts in Poznań, Poland, from 1965 to 1990 and a visiting professor at University of California, Los Angeles in 1984.

Early life
Magdalena Abakanowicz was born to a noble landowner family in Falenty. Her mother descended from old Polish nobility. Her father came from a Polonized Tatar family, which traced its origins to Abaqa Khan (a 13th-century Mongol chieftain). Her father's family fled Russia to the newly independent Poland after the October Revolution. She was the pioneer of fiber based sculpture and installation in 1960.

The Polish-Soviet War forced her family to flee their home, after which they moved to the city of Gdańsk. When she was nine Nazi Germany invaded and occupied Poland. Her family endured the war years living on the outskirts of Warsaw and became part of the Polish resistance. At the age of 14 she became a nurse's aid in a Warsaw hospital; seeing that the impact of war first hand would later influence her art. After the war, the family moved to the small city of Tczew near Gdańsk, in northern Poland, where they hoped to start a new life.

Under the newly-imposed communist doctrine, the Polish government officially adopted Socialist realism as the only acceptable art form which should be pursued by artists. It was originally conceived by Joseph Stalin in the 1930s, and was Socialist and realist  in nature. It had to be 'national in form' and 'socialist in content'. Other art forms being practiced at the time in the Western Bloc, such as Modernism, were officially outlawed and heavily censored in all Eastern Bloc nations, including Poland. Lack of official sanction did nothing to reduce her enthusiasm or alter the revolutionary course of her work.

Education 
Abakanowicz completed part of her high school education in Tczew from 1945 to 1947, after which she went to Gdynia for two additional years of art school at the Liceum Sztuk Plastycznych in that city. After her graduation from the Liceum in 1949, Abakanowicz attended the Academy of Fine Arts in Sopot (now in Gdańsk). In 1950, Abakanowicz moved back to Warsaw to begin her studies at the Academy of Fine Arts there, the leading art school in Poland. To get into the Academy she had to pretend to be the daughter of a clerk, because her noble background would otherwise have prevented her acceptance on the course.

Her years at the university, 1950–1954, coincided with some of the harshest assaults made on art by the leaders of the Eastern Bloc. By utilizing the doctrine of 'Socialist realism', all art forms in communist nations were forced to adhere to strict guidelines and limitations that subordinated the arts to the needs and demands of the State. Realist artistic depictions based on the national 19th-century academic tradition were the only form of artistic expression taught in Poland at the time. The Warsaw Academy of Fine Arts, being the most important artistic institution in Poland, came under special scrutiny from the Ministry of Art and Culture, which administered all major decisions in the field at the time.

Abakanowicz found the climate at the Academy to be highly "rigid" and overly "conservative". She recalled:

While studying at the University she was required to take several textile design classes, learning the art of weaving, screen printing, and fiber design from instructors such as Anna Sledziewska, Eleonora Plutyńska, and Maria Urbanowicz. These instructors and skills would greatly influence Abakanowicz's work, as well as that of other prominent Polish artists of the time.

First artworks

Following her education at the Academy, Abakanowicz began to produce her first artistic works. Due to the fact that she spent most of her academic life moving from place to place, much of her earlier artwork was lost or damaged, with only a few, delicate plant drawings surviving. Between 1956 and 1959, she produced some of her earliest known works; a series of large gouaches and watercolors on paper and sewn-together linen sheets. These works, described as being 'biomorphic" in composition, depicted imaginary plants, birds, exotic fish, and seashells, among other biomorphic shapes and forms. Joanna Inglot wrote in The Figurative Sculpture of Magdalena Abakanowicz about these early works: "[they] pointed to Abakanowicz's early fascination with the natural world and its processes of germination, growth, blooming, and sprouting. They seem to capture the very energy of life, a quality that would become a constant feature of her art." Abakanowicz said:

It was also during this time that Poland began to lift some of the heavy political pressures imposed by the Soviet Union, mainly due to the death of Soviet leader Joseph Stalin in 1953. In 1956, under the new party leadership of Władysław Gomułka, Poland experienced a dramatic social and cultural shift. The shift resulted in the liberalization of the forms and content of art, with the Stalinistic methods of art form being openly criticized by the Gomułka government.

A major freedom granted to Polish artists was the permission to travel to several Western cities, such as Paris, Venice, Munich, and New York City, to experience artistic developments outside the Eastern bloc. This liberalization of the arts in Poland and injection of other art forms into the Polish art world greatly influenced Abakanowicz's early works, as she began to consider much of her early work as being too flamboyant and lacking in structure. Constructivism began to influence her work in the late 1950s as she adopted a more geometric and structured approach. Never fully accepting Constructivism, she searched for her own "artistic language and for a way to make her art more tactile, intuitive, and personal." As a result, she soon adopted weaving as another avenue of artistic exploration.

In her first one-person exhibit at the Kordegarda Gallery in Warsaw in the spring of 1960, she included a series of four weavings along with a collection of gouaches and watercolors. Though her first exhibit received minimal critical notice, it helped advance her position within the Polish textile and fiber design movement and resulted in her inclusion into the first Biennale Internationale de le Tapisserie in Lausanne, Switzerland, in 1962. The event opened the way to her international success.

Series

Abakans 
The 1960s saw some of the most important works produced during Abakanowicz's career. In 1967, she began producing three-dimensional fiber works called Abakans. Her Abakans were included in a group exhibition titled, Wall Hangings, organised in 1969 at the Museum of Modern Art in New York by Mildred Constantine, curator of architecture and design, and the textile designer Jack Lenor Larsen. Abakanowicz and the other artists included in the exhibition were pushing boundaries between high art and traditional definitions of what was considered craft. Her use of "unexpected, often soft materials, arranged in modular or serial structures” in her Abakan series, places her within the Postminimalism art movement that began in 1966. Abakanowicz stated that she sought the “total obliteration of the utilitarian function of tapestry” and demonstrated the capacity of fiber to produce forms that were soft yet structured and complex.

Each Abakan is made out of woven material using Abakanowicz's own technique. The material used for many of these pieces was found, often collecting sisal ropes from harbors, intertwining them into threads and dying them.  She also used "rope, hemp, flax, wool and horsehair." Hung from the ceiling, Abakans reach sizes as large as thirteen feet with sometimes only a few inch clearance from the ground. The Abakans often incorporated reproductive references to eggs and the womb.

One of her large Abakans is included in the collection of the Nasher Sculpture Center in Dallas, Texas. The piece hangs on the wall and is made of five large recycled sisal panels in varying thickness and dyed in a burnt umber color. The work was acquired in 2019 and was exhibited in an exhibition titled Resist/Release.

Humanoid sculptures

During the 1970s, and into the 1980s, Abakanowicz changed medium and scale; she began a series of figurative and non-figurative sculptures made out of pieces of coarse sackcloth which she sewed and pieced together and bonded with synthetic resins. These works became more representational than previous sculptures but still retain a degree of abstraction and ambiguity. In 1974-1975 she produced sculptures called Alterations, which were twelve hollowed-out headless human figures sitting in a row. From 1973–1975 she produced a series of enormous, solid forms reminiscent of human heads without faces called Heads. From 1976-1980 she produced a piece call Backs, which was a series of eighty slightly differing sculptures of the human trunk.

In 1986-87 she created a series of fifty standing figures called Crowd I. She also began to once again work around organic structures, such as her Embryology series, which consisted of several dozen soft egg-like lumps varying in size. These were dispersed round an exhibition room at the Vienna Biennial in 1980.

These humanoid works of the 1970s and 1980s were centered around human culture and nature as a whole and its condition and position in modern society. The multiplicity of the human forms represents confusion and anonymity, analyzing an individual's presence in a mass of humanity. These works have close connections to Abakanowicz's life living in a Communist regime which repressed individual creativity and intellect in favor of the collective interest. These works also contrast with her earlier Abakan series, which were individually powerful pieces, whereas the figurative sculptures lost their individuality in favor of multiplicity.

In the late 1980s to 1990s Abakanowicz began to use metals, such as bronze, for her sculptures, as well as wood, stone, and clay. Her works from this period include Bronze Crowd (1990–91), shown in the garden of the Nasher Sculpture Center, and Puellae (1992), part of the National Gallery of Art's collection. She stated in a speech given at the Academy of Fine Arts in Łódź:

In 2019, her work featuring humanoid sculptures entitled Caminando, from the private collection of Robin Williams, set a new record at auction for an artwork sold in Poland by fetching 8 million zlotys (ca. US$2.1 million). This record was broken again twice in 2021 when in October another of her works known as Crowd III (1989) fetched 13.2 million zlotys (ca. $3.3 million) while in December her Bambini (1999) set of sculptures was sold for 13.6 million zloty.

War Games
One of Abakanowicz's most unusual works is titled War Games, which is a cycle of monumental structures made up of huge trunks of old trees, with their branches and bark removed. Partly bandaged with rags and hugged by steel hoops, these sculptures are placed on lattice metal stands. Like the name of the cycle implies, these sculptures have a very militaristic feel to them, as they have been compared to artillery vehicles. During the 1990s Abakanowicz was also commissioned to design a model of an ecologically-oriented city. She also choreographed dance.

Agora

Abakanowicz's final round of work includes a project called Agora, which is a permanent installation located at the southern end of Chicago's Grant Park, next to the Roosevelt Road Metra station. It consists of 106 cast iron figures, each about nine feet tall. All the figures are similar in shape, but different in details. The artist and her three assistants created models for each figure by hand, and the casting took place from 2004 to 2006. The surface of each figure resembles a tree bark or wrinkled skin. The work creates a feeling of crowdedness, hence the name "agora". Furthermore, all the bodies end at the torso, giving them an eerie, anonymous look.

Awards
 Grand Prix of São Paulo Biennale, São Paulo, Brazil (1965)
 Herder Prize, Vienna, Austria (1979)
 Jurzykowski Prize, New York City (1982)
 Award for Distinction in Sculpture, granted by the Sculpture Center, New York (1993)
 Commander Cross with Star of the Order of Polonia Restituta (1998)
 Pour le Mérite for Sciences and Arts, Berlin, Germany (1999)
 Officier de L'Ordre des Arts et des Lettres, Paris, France (1999)
 Leonardo da Vinci World Award of Arts, Norway (1999)
 Knight of the Order of Merit of the Italian Republic (2000)
 Visionaries! Award granted by American Craft Museum (2000)
 Lifetime Achievement in Contemporary Sculpture Award, International Sculpture Center, (Hamilton, NJ, USA) (2005)
 Germany's Star of the Grand Cross for Service to Germany (2010)

Doctorates and honors
 Honoris Causa doctorate from the Royal College of Art, London, England (1974)
 Honoris Causa doctorate from the Rhode Island School of Design, Providence, Rhode Island (1992)
 Honorary member of the Academy of Arts, Berlin (1994)
 Honorary member of the American Academy of Arts and Letters, New York City (1996)
 Honorary member of the Sachsische Akademie der Kunste, Dresden, Germany (1998)
 Honoris Causa doctorate from the Academy of Fine Arts, Łódź, Poland (1998)
 Honorary Doctor of Fine Arts degree, Pratt Institute, New York (2000)
 Honoris Causa doctorate from the Massachusetts College of Art, Boston, Massachusetts (2001)
 Honoris Causa doctorate from the Academy of Fine Arts in Poznań, Poland (2002)
 Honoris Causa doctorate from the School of the Art Institute of Chicago, Chicago, Illinois (2002)

Quotes
"I feel overawed by quantity where counting no longer makes sense. By unrepeatability within such a quantity. By creatures of nature gathered in herds, droves, species, in which each individual, while subservient to the mass, retains some distinguishing features. A crowd of people, birds, insects, or leaves is a mysterious assemblage of variants of certain prototype. A riddle of nature's abhorrence of exact repetition or inability to produce it. Just as the human hand cannot repeat its own gesture, I invoke this disturbing law, switching my own immobile herds into that rhythm."

"Art will remain the most astonishing activity of mankind born out of struggle between wisdom and madness, between dream and reality in our mind."

See also
 Abakanowicz
 List of Polish artists
 Socialist realism
 Birds of Knowledge of Good and Evil
 Agora
 Fiber art

References
Notes

Bibliography
 Reichardt, Jasia. Magdalena Abakanowicz. New York: Abbeville Press, 1982. 188 pp. 152 color and BW illus.  
 Abakanowicz, Magdalena, et al. Magdalena Abakanowicz. Davidson College, 2010.
 Inglot, Joanna. The Figurative Sculpture of Magdalena Abakanowicz: Bodies, Environments, and Myths. Berkeley and Los Angeles, Calif.: University of California Press, 2004. 
 Miller, Nancy, et al. Figuratively Speaking : Drawings by Seven Artists. Neuberger Museum, State University of New York at Purchase, 1989.
 Rose, Barbara. Magdalena Abakanowicz. New York: Harry N. Abrams, 1994. Print. http://www.worldcat.org/oclc/28506480

External links
 
 Magdalena Abakanowicz at culture.pl
 Women Artists and Postwar Abstraction | HOW TO SEE with MoMA curator Starr Figura

Museums
 Magdalena Abakanowicz at The Metropolitan Museum of Art, New York
 
 Magdalena Abakanowicz at the Nelson-Atkins Museum of Art, Kansas City, MO
 

Works
 Works by Magdalena Abakanowicz, Gallery Katarzyna Napiorkowska- Warsaw/Brussels

Articles
 Magdalena Abakanowicz, artnet
 The Jackboot Has Lifted. Now the Crowds Crush, By Rita Reif, The New York Times, June 3, 2001
  Magdalena Abakanowicz

Schools
 Gdańsk Academy of Fine Arts

1930 births
2017 deaths
Modern sculptors
Artists from Warsaw
People from Warsaw Voivodeship (1919–1939)
Polish people of Lipka Tatar descent
Knights Commander of the Order of Merit of the Federal Republic of Germany
Recipients of the Pour le Mérite (civil class)
Polish women sculptors
Polish contemporary artists
Recipients of the Gold Medal for Merit to Culture – Gloria Artis
Commanders of the Order of Polonia Restituta
Officiers of the Ordre des Arts et des Lettres
Members of the Academy of Arts, Berlin
Academy of Fine Arts in Warsaw alumni
20th-century Polish sculptors
20th-century Polish women artists
21st-century Polish sculptors
21st-century Polish women artists
Herder Prize recipients
Academy of Fine Arts in Gdańsk alumni
Recipients of the State Award Badge (Poland)
Academic staff of the University of Fine Arts in Poznań